The 1982 WCT Tournament of Champions was a men's tennis tournament played on outdoor clay courts at the West Side Tennis Club in Forest Hills, Queens, New York City in the United States and part of the 1982 World Championship Tennis circuit. It was the sixth edition of the tournament and was held from May 2 through May 9, 1982.

Finals

Singles
 Ivan Lendl defeated  Eddie Dibbs 6–1, 6–1
 It was Lendl's 8th singles title of the year and the 25th of his career.

Doubles
 Tracy Delatte /  Johan Kriek defeated  Dick Stockton /  Erik van Dillen 6–4, 3–6, 6–3

References

External links
 ITF tournament edition details

1982 World Championship Tennis circuit
World Championship Tennis Tournament of Champions
WCT Tournament of Champions